George Dale may refer to:

 George Dale (criminal) (1906–1934), lover and criminal partner of Eleanor Jarman, executed by the state of Illinois for murder
 George Dale (ichthyologist), American ichthyologist
 George R. Dale (1867–1936), American newspaper editor and politician in Indiana
 George N. Dale (1834–1903), American lawyer and politician in Vermont
 George Dale (footballer) (1892–1961), English association footballer